Olesya (Ukrainian and Russian: Олеся), may also be spelt Olessia or Olesia, is a feminine given name. 

Olesya is a Slavonic name that derives from a word "lyess" (Ukrainian "ліс", Russian "лес" - forest) and means  "a girl from the forest", "a girl living in the forest". A different version of the origin of the name states that Olesya is a variant of the name Alexandra, and thus acquires the meaning of "protector". The names Alesya and Lesya can be considered variants of Olesya. 

Notable people with the name include:
 Olesya Aliyeva (b. 1977), Russian alpine skier
 Olesya Babushkina (b. 1989), Belarusian gymnast
 Olesya Bakunova (b. 1980), Belarusian sprint canoer
 Olesya Barel (b. 1960), Russian basketball player
 Olesya Belugina (b. 1984), Russian gymnast
 Olesya Chumakova (b. 1981), Russian middle-distance runner
 Olesya Dudnik (b. 1974), Ukrainian gymnast and coach
 Olesya Forsheva (b. 1979), Russian athlete
 Olesya Hudyma (b. 1980), Ukrainian artist, poet and journalist
 Olesya Kurochkina (b. 1983), Russian football player
 Olesya Mashina (b. 1987), Russian footballer
 Olesya Nazarenko (born 1976), amateur wrestler, judoka and sambo player from Turkmenistan
 Olesya Nurgalieva (b. 1976), Russian ultramarathon runner
 Olesya Povh (b. 1987), Ukrainian sprinter
 Olesya Rostovskaya (b. 1975), Russian composer,  theremin player, carillonneur, organist, Russian zvon bell-ringer 
 Olesya Rulin (b. 1986), Russian-American actress
 Olesya Stefanko (b. 1988), Ukrainian beauty pageant winner
 Olesya Syreva (b. 1983), Russian athlete
 Olesya Velichko (b. 1981), Russian modern pentathlete
 Olesya Vladykina (b. 1988), Russian Paralympic swimmer
 Olesya Truntaeva (b. 1980), Russian footballer
 Olesya Zabara (b. 1982), Russian triple jumper
 Olesya Zamula (b. 1984), Azerbaijani wrestler
 Olesya Zykina (b. 1980), Russian athlete

Feminine given names